Stenopola puncticeps is a species of spur-throat toothpick grasshopper in the family Acrididae. It is found in Central and South America.

Subspecies
These subspecies belong to the species Stenopola puncticeps:
 Stenopola puncticeps amazonica Roberts & Carbonell, 1979
 Stenopola puncticeps curtipennis Roberts & Carbonell, 1979
 Stenopola puncticeps eumera (Hebard, 1923)
 Stenopola puncticeps limbatipennis Stål, 1873
 Stenopola puncticeps puncticeps (Stål, 1861)
 Stenopola puncticeps surinama (Bruner, 1920)
 Stenopola puncticeps tenae Roberts & Carbonell, 1979

References

External links

 

Acrididae